In cryptography, WG is a stream cypher algorithm developed by Guang Gong and Yassir Nawaz. It has been submitted to the eSTREAM Project of the eCRYPT network.

Stream ciphers